Davide Marchini (born 23 February 1981) is an Italian football coach and a former player.

Career
Marchini joined Chievo in 2003 on free transfer after the bankrupt of Alzano. Hr then joined Lanciano in co-ownership deal. He then signed by Sassari Torres in January 2005 and played two half season. In January 2006 he was signed by Triestina, where he played another half + half season.

Cagliari, Bologna & Livorno
In January 2007 he was loaned to Cagliari with option to joint-ownership (with Andrea Peana moved to opposite direction). He made his Serie A debut on 21 January 2007 against Calcio Catania. But in next season, Marchini only played once for Cagliari on Derby delle Isole in September. He was allowed to leave for injured his hand and family reason in October. But La Gazzetta dello Sport revealed that he was suspended by the club due to conflicts between Pasquale Foggia during training and later Marchini fight with others in a bar. Cagliari denied the fight was related to Foggia.

In June 2008 Triestina bought back Marchini and loaned him to Serie A newcomer Bologna. In July 2009, he joined Livorno, also newly promoted to Serie A.

Spezia & SPAL
On 20 August 2010, Marchini left for Spezia Calcio of the third division. Marchini played 3 times for Spezia in 2011–12 Lega Pro Prima Divisione. On 2 January 2012, Marchini terminated his contract with the club. On 31 January 2012, he signed a contract with SPAL 1907.

Honours
 Lega Pro Prima Divisione: 2011–12 (Spezia)

References

External links
 cagliaricalcio.net
http://www.gazzetta.it/speciali/statistiche/2008_nw/giocatori/73760.shtml

1981 births
Living people
Italian footballers
Association football midfielders
Serie A players
Serie B players
Serie C players
Serie D players
A.S.D. Victor San Marino players
S.S. Virtus Lanciano 1924 players
A.C. ChievoVerona players
U.S. Triestina Calcio 1918 players
Cagliari Calcio players
Bologna F.C. 1909 players
Virtus Bergamo Alzano Seriate 1909 players
S.E.F. Torres 1903 players
U.S. Livorno 1915 players
Spezia Calcio players
S.P.A.L. players
Sportspeople from the Province of Ferrara
Italian football managers
Serie D managers
Footballers from Emilia-Romagna